Maria Gatou (born 16 August 1989) is a Greek sprinter who competes in 100m and 200m in open track and 60m in indoor track. She competed in the 60 metres event at the 2014 IAAF World Indoor Championships.

Her personal best in 60m is 7.29 from 2014.

Honours

References

External links
 

1989 births
Living people
Greek female sprinters
Place of birth missing (living people)
Mediterranean Games bronze medalists for Greece
Mediterranean Games medalists in athletics
Athletes (track and field) at the 2009 Mediterranean Games
Athletes (track and field) at the 2013 Mediterranean Games
Athletes from Thessaloniki